Bartolomeo Contarini was a commander of the combined Venetian and Papal fleet at the Battle of Andros in 1696 during the Great Turkish War.

He subsequently commanded the Venetian fleet in the action of 6 July 1697.

References

17th-century military personnel
People of the Great Turkish War
Place of birth unknown
Place of death unknown
Republic of Venice admirals
Year of birth unknown
Year of death unknown
Republic of Venice people of the Ottoman–Venetian Wars